BVB (Bopha Vibol) is a private company conglomerate based in Phnom Penh, Cambodia.

BVB Investment Ltd
According to a United States Department of State Human Rights Practices report, NGOs reported that much of the leased area may be eligible for registration as indigenous community land under the 2001 law. The affected indigenous communities were not involved in lease negotiations.

Viriya BVB Insurance Plc
On Monday 6 April 2009, the Royal Government of Cambodia sold 75% of its shares in the formerly state owned CAMINCO insurance company for US$5.7 million. The Royal Government however, retains a 25% share in the company. The existence of the deal was not widely known. Cheam Yeap, the head of the National Assembly's banking and finance committee and a Cambodian People's Party MP, told the Phnom Penh Post that he knew nothing about it.

BVB Machinery Trading Co Ltd
The BVB Machinery Trading Company is a machinery warehouse based on the National Road No 6A.

See also
Cambodian National Insurance Company

References

External links
2008 Human Rights Report: Cambodia
Caminco

Companies based in Phnom Penh